Louis Hunter (born 17 March 1992) is an Australian actor. He was born in Glebe, one of the central districts of Sydney. After training in numerous acting and theatre programs as a child and attending a performing arts high school, Hunter began his professional acting career in 2008 after he booked a leading role on the Australian TV show Out of the Blue. He then quickly followed up with a role in the stage production of The War of the Roses at the Sydney Theatre Company alongside Cate Blanchett. Hunter made his American debut in the TV show The Secret Circle. He also appeared as Nick Stratos in The Fosters. Hunter also appears in the 2018 BBC One/Netflix production, Troy: Fall of a City.

Early life 
Hunter was born in Sydney, Australia. He has been acting since he was 16 years old, with his first role as Kyle Mulroney in Out of the Blue (2008). He also appeared in 7 episodes of The Secret Circle (2011). Hunter started his acting career in theatre, performing the role of Prince Edward in The War of the Roses for Sydney Theatre Company, contrary Cate Blanchett, and in the role of Mercutio in Romeo & Juliet for the Shakespeare Youth Festival behind time.

Filmography

Films

Television

References

External links
EXCLUSIVE! Louis Hunter Answers Some Tough Secret Circle Questions

1993 births
Living people
Australian male film actors
21st-century Australian male actors
Male actors from Sydney